Boa Esperança is a municipality located in the Brazilian state of Espírito Santo. Its population was 15,092 (2020) and its area is 429 km². Its average altitude is 140 meters above sea level.

References

Municipalities in Espírito Santo